Jonte may refer to:
 Jonte (river), a tributary of the Tarn in Southern France
People
 Jonté Buhl (born 1982), a professional Canadian football cornerback free agent
 Jonte Willis (born 1983), an American heavyweight boxer
 Antonio Álvarez Jonte (1784–1820), an Argentine politician